The 1922 Wisconsin gubernatorial election was held on November 7, 1922.

Incumbent Republican Governor John J. Blaine won re-election to a second term, defeating Democratic nominee Arthur A. Bentley and Socialist nominee Louis A. Arnold.

Primary elections
Primary elections were held on September 5, 1922.

Democratic primary

Candidates
Arthur A. Bentley, mayor of La Crosse, Democratic nominee for Wisconsin's 7th congressional district in 1918
Karl Mathie, paper manufacturer, former president of the Friends of German Democracy

Results

Republican primary

Candidates
John J. Blaine, incumbent Governor
A. C. McHenry, unsuccessful candidate for Republican nomination for U.S. Senate in 1920
William J. Morgan, incumbent Attorney General of Wisconsin

Results

Socialist primary

Candidates
Louis A. Arnold, Tax Commissioner of Milwaukee

Results

Prohibition primary

Candidates
M. L. Welles

Results

General election

Candidates
Major party candidates
John J. Blaine, Republican
Arthur A. Bentley, Independent Democrat

The Democratic Party was forced to run candidates as independents, as they were not recognized as a legal party due to failing to poll the required number of votes in the primary election.

Other candidates
M. L. Welles, Prohibition
Louis A. Arnold, Socialist
Arthur A. Dietrich, Independent Socialist Labor

Results

References

Bibliography
 
 

1922
Wisconsin
Gubernatorial
November 1922 events